The Gonghe Regency was an interregnum period in Chinese history from 841 BC to 828 BC, after King Li of Zhou was exiled by his nobles during the Compatriots Rebellion, when the Chinese people rioted against their old corrupt king. It lasted until the ascension of King Li's son, King Xuan of Zhou.

History
King Li of Zhou was a corrupt and decadent ruler. To pay for his pleasures and vices, King Li raised taxes and caused misery among his subjects. It is said that he barred the commoners from profiting from communal forests and lakes, and instated a new law which allowed him to punish anyone, by death, who dared to speak against him. King Li's tyrannical rule soon forced many peasants and soldiers all around Zhou China into revolt. Li was sent into exile at a place called Zhi near Linfen (842 BC), his son was taken by one of his ministers and hidden.

When King Li died in exile in 828 BC, power was passed to his son, the King Xuan of Zhou.

Interpretations
According to the Han dynasty historian Sima Qian (who interpreted gonghe as 'joint harmony' in his Records of the Grand Historian), during the Gonghe Regency, the Zhou dynasty was ruled jointly by two dukes, the Duke Ding of Zhou and the Duke Mu of Shao, hence effectively transforming the state into a coregency.

Later discoveries proved this incorrect. According to the Bamboo Annals, an archaeologically unearthed text discovered in antiquity but postdating Sima Qian, the Gonghe Regency was a period in which the Zhou dynasty was ruled by a single person — He, Elder of the Gong lineage. This reading has been fully corroborated by an independent archaeologically unearthed text known as the Xinian (繫年).

Historiographical significance

The first year of the Gonghe Regency, 841 BC, is highly significant in ancient Chinese history, in that Sima Qian was able to construct a year-by-year chronology back to that point, but he and subsequent historians were unable to confidently date any earlier events in Chinese history. Sima himself found the information about earlier dates in his sources to be unreliable and contradictory and so chose not to adopt them in his work.  The government of the People's Republic of China sponsored the Xia–Shang–Zhou Chronology Project, a multidisciplinary project that sought to give better estimates for dates prior to 841 BC, but the project's draft report, published in 2000, has been criticized by various scholars.

When encountering the western term  'republic', the modern Chinese (as well as the Japanese), borrowed the word gonghe to have this meaning. Historically, however, the Gonghe period during the Zhou dynasty does not confer any republican connotations: the people of the time having had no opposition to monarchy as such, but only to one specific king.

Notes

References

Zhou dynasty kings
Regents of China
9th-century BC Chinese monarchs
Regency (government)
Interregnums
9th century BC in China